Jean-Luc Mandaba (15 August 1943 – 22 October 2000) was Prime Minister of the Central African Republic from 25 October 1993 to 12 April 1995 under President Ange-Félix Patassé.

Biography
Mandaba was born on 15 August 1943 in Bangui. He received his primary education in Bangui. After his primary school certificate, he attended the St Marcel Sibut school and studied at Fort Archambault (Chad) and College Emile Gentil in Bangui. He studied nursing in Brazzaville and received a diploma in 1963. He joined the civil service as a sanitary hygiene inspector in 1965. Mandaba served in the military in Brazzaville from 1965 to 1966 before continuing his medical studies at the Joint faculty of Medicine and Pharmacy of Nantes and Rennes Medical school in France where he obtained the degree of Doctor of Medicine in 1972. He then specialized in surgery and obtained a general surgery degree from the University of Paris VI in 1976.

He returned to the Central African Republic and established a pediatric service at the National Hospital in Bangui. He won acclaim as a surgeon and was appointed Minister of Health in 1980, serving until 1981. He became Professor of Pediatric Surgery in 1983. In 1986, he became head of the department of obstetrics and gynecology at the University Hospital. Mandaba was also involved in several important sports positions.

Mandaba served as vice president of the MPLC before becoming Prime Minister. On 25 October 1993, shortly after Ange-Félix Patassé became president, he appointed Mandaba to the position of Prime Minister. He was forced to resign as Prime Minister in April 1995 to preempt a threatened vote of no-confidence in the government following accusations of corruption and incompetence. Gabriel Koyambounou replaced him as prime minister. From 1995 to his death he was Chairman of the Board of the Central African Sugar Management Company (SOGESCA). After the second army mutiny of 1996, he and Jean Serge Ouafio set up the 'Karako' militia forces, which Patassé then brought into the military to balance the predominance of southern Yakoma in the armed forces inherited from the Kolingba era. 

After attending a dinner to celebrate the first anniversary of Patassé's second term on 21 October 2000, Mandaba suddenly felt sick and died at home of a heart attack. His family claimed that Mandaba was in fact poisoned at the dinner party, as he supposedly was thought to be planning a coup to overthrow Patassé. Their suspicion was strongly supported when his 31-year-old son Hervé died under similar circumstances a few weeks later. He performed a final surgery hours before he died.

Notes

References

External links
2002 United Nations Emergency and Security Service report on the Central African Republic

1943 births
2000 deaths
Prime Ministers of the Central African Republic
People from Bangui